This is the complete filmography of Golden Globe Award and Primetime Emmy Award-winning actress, voice artist, comedian, writer, director, and producer Amy Poehler.

Film

Television

Actor

Writer

Executive producer

Director

References

Poehler, Amy
Poehler, Amy